Glomeridae is a family of pill millipedes in the order Glomerida. It includes dozens of genera, including many which are yet to be described  the family includes at least the following genera:

Apheromeris
Apiomeris
Armadillo
Corsikomeris
Dinoglomeris
Epiromeris
Euglomeris
Eupeyerimhoffia
Eurypleuromeris
Geoglomeris
Glomerellina
Glomeris
Glomeroides
Haploglomeris
Hyleoglomeris
Hyperglomeris
Lamisca
Loboglomeris
Malayomeris
Myrmecomeris
Nesoglomeris
Okeanomeris
Onomeris
Onychoglomeris
Patriziomeris
Peplomeris
Perkeomeris
Protoglomeris
Rhopalomeris
Rhyparomeris
Schismaglomeris
Sicilomeris
Simplomeris
Sonoromeris
Spelaeoglomeris
Speluncomeris
Stenopleuromeris
Strasseria
Stygioglomeris
Sundameris
Trachysphaera
Trichoglomeris
Trichomeris
Trinacriomeris
Xestoglomeris
Zygethomeris

References

Glomerida
Millipede families